Chirath Mapatuna (born 22 April 1988) is a Sri Lankan first-class cricketer. He made his first-class debut for Kurunegala Youth Cricket Club in Tier B of the 2016–17 Premier League Tournament on 2 December 2016.

References

External links
 

1993 births
Living people
Sri Lankan cricketers
Kurunegala Youth Cricket Club cricketers
Cricketers from Colombo